Pierre Assouline (born 17 April 1953) is a French writer and journalist. He was born in Casablanca, Morocco to a Jewish family. He has published several novels and biographies, and also contributes articles for the print media and broadcasts for radio.

As a biographer, he has covered a diverse and eclectic range of subjects, including:
 Henri Cartier-Bresson, the legendary photographer
 Marcel Dassault, the aeronautics pioneer
 Gaston Gallimard, the publisher
 Hergé, the creator of The Adventures of Tintin
 Daniel-Henry Kahnweiler, the art dealer
 Georges Simenon, the detective novelist and creator of Inspector Maigret

Several of these books have been translated into English and the Henri Cartier-Bresson biography has been translated into Chinese.

As a journalist, Assouline has worked for the leading French publications Lire and Le Nouvel Observateur. He also publishes a blog, "La république des livres".

Wikipedia
Assouline was the editor of La Révolution Wikipédia, a collection of essays by postgraduate journalism students under his supervision. Assouline contributed the preface.

On 7 January 2007, Assouline published a blog post criticizing the Wikipedia entry on the Dreyfus Affair.

References

1953 births
Living people
People from Casablanca
French biographers
French bloggers
20th-century French Sephardi Jews
20th-century Moroccan Jews
Prix des libraires winners
Prix Maison de la Presse winners
French literary critics
Lycée Janson-de-Sailly alumni
20th-century French journalists
21st-century French journalists
Academic staff of Sciences Po
20th-century French writers
20th-century French male writers
21st-century French writers
French male non-fiction writers
Male bloggers
Jewish journalists
Jewish non-fiction writers
Male biographers
Institut national des langues et civilisations orientales alumni